Mangalpur is a village and a gram panchayat in Kanpur Dehat district in the Indian state of Uttar Pradesh.

Geography
Mangalpur is situated on the banks of the Pata Canal.The district headquarters is nearly 30 km away at Mati in the Kanpur Dehat district in the Indian state of Uttar Pradesh.

History
Mangalpur is first noted in Indian political history in 1901 when the British came for the first time to Mangalpur from Bithur. They established a police station named Thana Mangalpur. Many Mangalpur villagers took part in the Indian freedom fight.

Nearby Cities & Towns
Towards South - Orai and Jhansi.
Towards  West - Auraiya, Etawah
Towards East- Raniya, Kanpur
Towards North- Jhinjhak

Places of interest
 Chaturbhuj Baba temple 
 Lalmathi Mandir
 Great Pond

References

Cities and towns in Kanpur Dehat district